The 2021 Lanka Premier League Final was played on 23 December 2021 at the Mahinda Rajapaksa International Cricket Stadium, Hambantota, Sri Lanka. It was a day/night twenty20 match between Galle Gladiators and Jaffna Kings, which decided the winner of 2021 season of the Lanka Premier League (LPL), an annual franchise cricket tournament in Sri Lanka. Jaffna Kings won the match by 23 runs beating Galle Gladiators, to win their second successive LPL title.

Road to the final

Scorecard

Keys:
 (C) indicates team captain
  indicates Wicket-keeper
On-field umpires: Lyndon Hannibal and Raveendra Wimalasiri
Third umpire: Ruchira Palliyaguruge
Reserve umpire: Prageeth Rambukwella
Match referee: Ranjan Madugalle

Toss: Jaffna Kings won the toss and elected to bat.

Result: Jaffna Kings won by 23 runs.
 

|colspan="4"| Extras 6 (b 1, lb 2, wd 3)
 Total 201/3 (20 overs)
|15
|12
|10.05 RR

Fall of wickets: 1-56 (Rahmanullah Gurbaz, 5.2 ov), 2-119 (Avishka Fernando, 12.4 ov), 3-181 (Shoaib Malik, 18.2 ov)

Target: 202 runs from 20 overs at 10.10 RR

|colspan="4"| Extras 13 (b 1, lb 10, wd 2) Total 178/9 (20 overs)
|17
|5
|10.10 RR

Fall of wickets: 1-63 (Danushka Gunathilaka, 4.2 ov), 2-63 (Ben Dunk, 4.3 ov), 3-84 (Mohammad Hafeez, 6.2 ov), 4-113 (Bhanuka Rajapaksa, 10.4 ov), 5-129 (Kusal Mendis, 13.1 ov), 6-133 (Dhananjaya Lakshan, 13.6 ov), 7-143 (Pulina Tharanga, 15.5 ov), 8-158 (Samit Patel, 17.6 ov), 9-168 (Isuru Udana, 18.5 ov)

References

2021 in Sri Lankan cricket
2021 Lanka Premier League